Copadichromis atripinnis is a species of fish in the family Cichlidae. It is endemic to Lake Malawi in Malawi. Its natural habitat is freshwater lakes.

References

Endemic fauna of Malawi
atripinnis
Taxa named by Jay Richard Stauffer Jr.
Fish described in 2002
Taxonomy articles created by Polbot
Fish of Malawi
Fish of Lake Malawi